Orlando Miguel Rojas González (born July 18, 1969, in Havana, Cuba) is a Cuban-Mexican actor. He made his small-screen debut as the character Osvaldo Larrea in Lazos de Amor, alongside Lucero.

Filmography
 Tierra de Reyes (2015) TV Series ..... Jack Malkovich
 Tu Voz Estereo (2011)
 Mujeres al Limite (2010)
 Terapia de Pareja (2010)
 Salvador de mujeres (2010) TV Series .... Felipe
 Rosario Tijeras (2010) TV Series .... Mr.Robinson
 Tiempo Final (2009) TV Series .... Agent Rodriguez
 La Marca del Deseo (2008) TV Series .... Alfredo Pardo
 Lorena (2005) TV Series .... Gerardo Ferrero
 Ángel de la guarda, mi dulce compañía (2003) TV Series .... Fernando
 La Venganza (2002) TV Series .... Felipe Valerugo Rangel
 Cómplices al rescate (2002) TV Series .... Pepe
 Carita de ángel (2000) TV Series
 DKDA: Sueños de juventud (1999) TV Series .... Jerónimo
 El niño que vino del mar (1999) TV Series .... Enrique Cáceres de Ribera
 Ángela (1998) TV Series .... Pedro Solórzano Mateos
 Una luz en el camino (1998) TV Series .... Miguel
 Pueblo chico, infierno grande (1997) TV Series .... Palemón Morales (father and son)
 Sentimientos Ajenos (1996) TV Series .... Darío
 Lazos de Amor (1996) TV Series .... Osvaldo Larrea

External links
 

1969 births
Living people
Mexican male television actors
Mexican male telenovela actors
Naturalized citizens of Mexico
Cuban emigrants to Mexico